At least two warships of Japan have borne the name Akagi:

 Japanese gunboat Akagi, which served in the Sino-Japanese War
 Japanese aircraft carrier Akagi, which served in World War II

Japanese Navy ship names
Imperial Japanese Navy ship names